The Chola dynasty ruled southern India until the 13th century.

Chola may also refer to:

Buildings 
 ITC Grand Chola Hotel, in Chennai, India
 Chola Sheraton, a hotel in Chennai, India

People 
 Alex Chola (1956-1993), Zambian footballer
 Chola Chabuca (b. 1970), Peruvian television personality

Places
 Chola Nadu, a region of Tamil Nadu, India
 Chola Mountains, in Sichuan, China
 Chola (historical city) (Russian: Чола), a former city and state in Russia

Other 
 Chola (film), a 2019 Indian Malayalam-language film
 Chola (Mexican subculture), a Latino subculture originating in Los Angeles
 Chola incident, a series of military clashes between India and China in 1967
 Puntius chola, a fish commonly known as the swamp barb
 Sikh chola, a robe-like unisex garment worn by Sikh warriors and religious workers
 A variation of the derogatory term Cholo, meaning a mixed-blooded woman in the Spanish Empire

See also
 Cho La (disambiguation)
 Cholla (disambiguation)
 Cholai
 Cola (disambiguation)